Bareiss or Bareiß is a surname. Notable people with the surname include:

Thomas Bareiß (born 1975), German politician
Walter Bareiss (1919–2007), German-American businessman and art collector

Others
Bareiss Prüfgerätebau GmbH, a German materials testing company founded in 1954

See also
Bareiss algorithm